Sunkarie Kabba-Kamara (born May 29, 1969) is a Sierra Leonean politician and the current mayor of the city of Makeni. She is currently the only female mayor in Sierra Leone's six City Council municipalities. She is a member of the ruling All People's Congress (APC) political party.

She surprisingly defeated the incumbent mayor of Makeni Moses Musa Sesay in a landslide in the APC primary election held on September 2, 2012, in Makeni.

She won the 2012 mayoral election with 86.95%, over her main opponent Abu A Koroma of the Sierra Leone People's Party, and was sworn in as mayor on December 22, 2012. Her inauguration ceremony  was attended by many senior members of the APC party, including Sierra Leone's president Ernest Bai Koroma.

Sunkari Kabba-Kamara is a native of Bombali District in Northern Sierra Leone, and a member of the Mandingo ethnic group.

References

External links

1969 births
All People's Congress politicians
People from Bombali District
Living people